The Parliamentary Standing Committee on Home Affairs (SCOHA) is a department related standing committee (DRSC) of selected members of parliament, constituted by the Parliament of India, for the purpose of legislative oversight of the domestic policy, internal security and decision making of the Ministry of Home Affairs. It is one of the 24 DRSCs that have been mandated with the onerous task of ministry specific oversight.

The committee currently is headed by MP Anand Sharma.

Current composition 
Each of the committees have 31 members – 21 from Lok Sabha and 10 from Rajya Sabha.  These members are to be nominated by the Speaker of Lok Sabha or the Chairman of Rajya Sabha respectively. The term of office of these committees does not exceed one year. These committees are serviced either by Lok Sabha secretariat or the Rajya Sabha secretariat, depending on who has appointed the chairman of that committee.

Following are the members of the Parliamentary Standing Committee on Home Affairs

Comments and reports

Tek Fog  
In January 2022, MP Derek O'Brien (Trinamool Congress) and a member of the Parliamentary Standing Committee on Home Affairs wrote to Anand Sharma, head of the committee to discuss the secret app "Tek Fog" that "has serious ramifications and could jeopardise national security". He wrote, "This application is capable of penetrating encrypted messaging platforms and secure social media conversations, in order to heavily manipulate and exploit narratives on said platforms."

On 12 January, Congress leader and leader of the party in the Lok Sabha Adhir Ranjan Chowdhury also wrote to the chairman of the Parliamentary Standing Committee on Home Affairs, Anand Sharma, asking the committee discuss the "Violative Software Application 'Tek Fog'", in their next meeting.

The Parliamentary standing committee asked the Union Home Ministry to provide information about the 'Tek Fog' app that was allegedly used for manipulating social media trends. On 12 February, responding to the request, MoS for Electronics and Information Technology Rajeev Chandrasekhar said, "The ministry has searched for the app on all prominent app stores and APK stores and could not find so called app in any of these online stores."

Police reforms 
In 2022, the committee submitted to Rajya Sabha, its report titled "Police — Training, Modernisation and Reforms", the committee expressed concern about the low representation of women in police forces, at only 10.30%.

Chairpersons

See also 

 17th Lok Sabha
 Estimates Committee
 Committee on Public Undertakings
 Public Accounts Committee (India)
 Standing Committee on Finance

References 

Committees of the Parliament of India
Ministry of Home Affairs (India)
India